Fernsehturm Stuttgart is a  telecommunications tower in Stuttgart, Germany. It was the first telecommunications tower in the world constructed from reinforced concrete, and it is the prototype for many such towers worldwide. Although controversial at first, it quickly became a well known landmark of Stuttgart and a tourist attraction.

Location
The tower is located on the hill Hoher Bopser (elevation 483 meters) in the southern Stuttgart borough of Degerloch. From the observation decks there is a view of Stuttgart, from the forests and vineyards in and around Stuttgart to the Swabian Jura and the Black Forest.

History
The tower's construction was controversial – critics opposed the new building method and its costs; a simple 200-meter antenna array would have cost just 200,000 DM. Construction began on 10 January 1954 and continued for 20 months. This made it the first telecom tower in the world built with reinforced concrete. The construction cost was 4.2 million DM. Revenues from visitors reached that sum within five years. The tower was placed in service on 5 February 1956 by Süddeutscher Rundfunk (today Südwestrundfunk – SWR). It was part of the German state visit of Queen Elizabeth II of the United Kingdom in May 1965.

The tower reached its current height of  after the antenna was extended from October 1965 to December 1965.

Specifications
 Engineer: Fritz Leonhardt
 Overall height to the antenna point:  
 Height of upper observation deck: 
 Height of lower observation deck: 
 Diameter of foundation:  
 Total weight of tower: approximately 3,000 tons 
 Weight of foundation: approximately 1,500 tons 
 Speed of elevators:  
 Panorama Café on a platform of the tower basket 
 Maximum diameter of tower basket:

Broadcasting
The tower is still known as Fernsehturm but today only broadcasts several public FM radio stations. Transmission of the ARD TV network's analogue service stopped in 2006. The digital television services have moved to nearby Fernmeldeturm Stuttgart, which also broadcasts private FM radio stations in the area.

Air traffic warning lights 
The tower carries beside the conventional red air traffic warning lights three rotating xenon lamps similar to those used on lighthouses just above the observation deck.

Public access
On 27 March 2013 the tower was closed to the public because of a review of fire safety regulations. The tower was reopened on 30 January 2016 with a refurbished entrance, shop area and new, optimised fire safety precautions.

Gallery

See also 

 Fernmeldeturm Mannheim
 Rheinturm Düsseldorf
 Sentech Tower, Johannesburg
 Donauturm, Vienna
 CN Tower, Toronto
 Macau Tower
 Sky Tower (Auckland), Auckland
 Fernsehturm Berlin
 Space Needle, Seattle
 Ostankino Tower, Moscow

References

Further reading

External links 
 TV tower Stuttgart 
 Satellite Image

Buildings and structures in Stuttgart
Communication towers in Germany
Observation towers in Baden-Württemberg
Radio masts and towers in Germany
Towers completed in 1956
Tourist attractions in Stuttgart
Observation towers
Restaurant towers
1956 establishments in West Germany